Dragon Quest is a series of role-playing video games that originated in 1986 with the release of the first game in the series. Although the games are not related in terms of story, many aspects of the gameplay are consistent throughout the series. Each game in the series add new elements to the gameplay, such as longer quests, character classes, or different ways of story-telling.

One of the major aspects of the Dragon Quest series is that it retains the same setting and general gameplay throughout the series, instead of reinventing itself with each new installment. This has been seen as both a positive and negative aspect by critics of the series.

History

Dragon Quest was created by Yūji Horii, who became the series' main scenario director. Yūji Horii originally used the full-screen map of Ultima and the first-person menu battle and stats oriented Wizardry screen to create the gameplay of Dragon Quest. Dragon Quest is often cited as the birth of the JRPGs. Each game in the main series builds upon its predecessor, but the gameplay never strays from the series' origins.

When asked about the game's resistance to change during an interview, Horii explained that he wants to "keep it simple and keep things organized, after twenty years I've found this to be the best way." During the same interview, Horii also stated that he would never want to make an action role-playing game for the series. He said "The reason why is because I want to make the game fun and simple and relaxing, so that you can just sit down and take it easy. People who don't like to think very much can just push the button and still get by. The people who like to think and strategize have to option to do that as well." Although Dragon Quest IX was slated to have an action-oriented combat style, it was changed back to menu-based combat in 2007, two years before its release in response to backlash from fans.

Common elements
In each installment of the Dragon Quest series, players have been able to control a party of up to four characters. The number of party members depends on the game, as well as the number of enemies that can appear in one battle. Dragon Quest featured only one-on-one encounters, whereas Dragon Quest II expanded the party to three characters and the number of enemies was also increased. Dragon Quest III further increased the party size to four characters, which it has stayed at. Players must move their parties through different towns, dungeons, and the world map in order to progress throughout each game. Typically, the party must enter a town or dungeon and defeat a specific enemy or retrieve an item to progress the story. Non-playable characters exist in the game for the party to interact with. NPCs are responsible for giving the player useful information, selling items, saving the player's game, or healing the party, usually at an inn for a fee. Heroes in the series often must defeat a main antagonist to complete the adventure, and there are always several tasks they must do before that, often involving NPCs from different towns.

In Dragon Quest, players had to go through a menu in order to use stairs, open treasure chests, and speak to NPCs. The localization of the game also included some gameplay improvements such as being able to see the direction your character is traveling and the ability to save your game through a battery backup instead of passwords. While improvements were made in later versions, the series retained the same basic interface.

Dragon Quest features "puff puff" massage girls the player can opt to get a service from. In earlier games, the background would turn black and text would be displayed; in some later games, gags have been used. These were removed from some North American translations, but not others. Also, in later games monsters and characters can use this as an attack. The effect can cause enemies and characters to lose their turn.

Exploration
Until Dragon Quest VIII, exploration was all from an overhead view, while battles were in a first-person perspective. Dragon Quest VIII changed this system by featuring fully three dimensional environments and battles in the third-person. Earlier Dragon Quest games were released using solely 2D graphics. Starting with Dragon Quest VII, 3D graphics were introduced, however the graphics were extremely limited compared to those released in Dragon Quest VIII. Since then, every game, including the remakes for the Nintendo DS, has included some level of 3D gameplay.

Dragon Quest games often feature different forms of vehicles for the party to explore the world map in. These vehicles allow the party to cross terrain that cannot be walked over. These include ships, which give the party the option of traveling on water. Dragon Quest IV featured a hot air balloon, which enabled the party to travel over mountains.

Battle

Each Dragon Quest game in the main series is a role-playing video game and features turn-based battles. During battle, players can issue commands to the party and then the characters and monsters will take turns attacking each other. Certain characters are also able to use magic or skills, and these commands can either damage enemies, recover hit points or remove status ailments, or raise and lower statistics of party members or enemies. Until Dragon Quest IX, battles were randomly occurring in the series. While moving the party through either a dungeon or the world map, there is a chance that an enemy group will attack. In Dragon Quest IX, enemies are visible on the field and players must touch them to enter a battle.

Characters earn experience points for each monster the party defeats in battle. As characters earn experience points, they gain levels and their stats increase, making them stronger. These stats include hit points, magic points, strength, agility, and vitality. In certain games, including Dragon Quest VII, characters will also earn different types of points from battles. In Dragon Quest VII, every battle characters are victorious in earns them class points, which allow them to increase their class levels and eventually master that class. Winning battles also grants gold to the party, which can be spent on items at stores, at inns, or at churches in order to heal or revive characters.

Dragon Quest IV introduced a "Tactics" system, where the player can set the AI routines for NPCs, which is seen as a precursor to Final Fantasy XII'''s "Gambits" system. Dragon Quest V gave players the opportunity to catch and raise various monsters that appeared in random encounters. These monsters could be added to the player's party and participate in battle, earning experience points just as human party members do. This feature would span its own series of games titled Dragon Quest Monsters  Monster catching would appear in Dragon Quest VII briefly by having a monster park minigame in which players could put monsters caught after battles.

Character classes
Beginning with Dragon Quest III, the series has featured different forms of character customization. Players were given the option to create a party of four characters consisting of the main Hero and three characters made by the player. Classes such as Warrior, Mage, Cleric, or Merchant could be set upon the character and that character's statistics and skills would correlate with the given class. Dragon Quest VI, Dragon Quest VII, and Dragon Quest IX all featured similar class systems, building off of the original system from Dragon Quest III.

Abilities
Characters in the Dragon Quest games can use a wide variety of abilities, spells, and skills. The original game only featured a few healing and damaging spells, but each game expanded on the list. Dragon Quest VI introduced , a class of non-spell special abilities. Most spells cost magic points, while many skills have no MP cost.

 Mini medals 

Starting with Dragon Quest IV, a new collectable item known as mini medals were introduced. These mini medals have since been used in every main Dragon Quest title. The medals resemble small gold coins with a five-point star in the middle. The player collects these medals throughout the game by opening chests, breaking pots and barrels and searching sacks and drawers. In Dragon Quest IX, the player can also obtain some by completing quests or from a spawn point on the world map. At a certain point during the games, the player meets a character he can trade these medals for items. From Dragon Quest IV through VII this was a reoccurring character known as the Mini Medal King. While he is replaced in later Dragon Quest titles, he continue to be referenced. In Dragon Quest VIII he makes an appearance, but it is his daughter who collects the medals. In Dragon Quest IX, although the medals are collected by a pirate captain, the dialog references his connection to the Mini Medal Kings.

According to Horii, he wanted to have something the player went around collecting as the previous Dragon Quest games had crests and orbs respectively. However, he did not want to do the same thing over again by forcing the player to collect a certain number of items before they beat the game; mini medals instead have nothing to do with clearing the game.

Minigames
During gameplay, players may be able to participate in minigames. Mini-medals can be found and traded for exclusive items, a feature that can be traced to Dragon Quest IV and was featured in remakes of earlier games in the series. In addition to mini-medals, the remake of Dragon Quest III allowed players to collect monster medals from their perspective monsters. The remake also featured Pachisi, or Suguroku in Japan, a board game style minigame in which the player could win items. This game was based on Horii's other video game series, Itadaki Street. 

Several games in the series feature casinos for players to win items by playing various games, including poker and betting on monster battles. The DS remake of Dragon Quest V features several new minigames, including Bruise the Ooze, Treasures 'n' Trapdoors, a version of Pachisi, the Slurpodrome, and the tombola.

Reception and legacy
The gameplay of Dragon Warrior is seen by critics as revolutionary. In an article for Gamasutra, Kurt Kalata pointed out that the game "was also one of the most in-depth games seen on the Famicom at the time. Back in 1986, if you wanted a complicated game, you needed an expensive PC." A large aspect of the Dragon Quest games is the continuity of the series' gameplay. When comparing the four NES games, Kyle Knight of Allgame pointed out that the games made little innovation in terms of gameplay and graphics, but that each installment was longer and had more depth to it than the one before it. In Dragon Warrior IV, he argued, "you still have to work around the Dragon Warrior menu system. To open doors, talk to characters, or perform any other action, you have to go to the hotspot for that appropriate action, go to the menu, then click on the appropriate verb." Chris Kohler of Wired noted that the remake of Dragon Quest IV felt "like a retro game" and that "it'll seem very nostalgic and fun to anyone who has fond memories of poking through Dragon Quest IV on their Famicom". Mark Bozon complained of "simple and archaic menus" in his IGN review of Dragon Quest V.

IGN described Dragon Warrior VII's class system as "one of the best class systems seen outside a strategy RPG." In a preview for Dragon Quest IX on 1UP, Jeremey Parish noted that the character customization was a welcome departure from the series of games with only predetermined characters and wrote that "You can define your angel warrior's basic appearance to a degree, but he or she will look like an escapee from a Dragon Ball cartoon no matter what."

LegacyDragon Warrior was listed on GameSpot's list of the 15 most influential games of all time, calling it the "most influential role-playing game of all time" and stated that nearly all Japanese RPGs today have roots in its gameplay. GameSpot also noted that the game's 2D graphics were imitated by most Japanese RPGs until video games began using 3D graphics. In another Gamasutra article, Kalata claimed that Dragon Quest was the first of its genre and that it "went on to inspire dozens of clones. Most of these are best left forgotten, but it did inspire two more notable franchises: Square's Final Fantasy and Sega's Phantasy Star''". He also noted that when first localized for North America, it was not immediately popular due to "subpar" graphics and "stodgy interface".

Notes and references

External links
Dragon Quest Zenithia Trilogy Official Site

Dragon Quest
Dragon Quest